Anteosauridae is an extinct family of large carnivorous dinocephalian therapsids that are known from the Middle Permian of Asia, Africa, and South America.These animals were by far the largest predators of the Permian period, with skulls reaching 80 cm in length in adult individuals, far larger than the biggest gorgonopsian.

Description
 
Anteosaurids are characterized by very large pointed incisors and canines, bulbous spatulate (spoon shaped) postcanines, a very strongly  upturned margin of the premaxilla, so the front of mouth curves strongly upwards, and a long, very robust lower jaw (Boonstra 1963).

Anteosaurids distinguished from Brithopus and other non-anteosaurid anteosaurians by the presence of a large thickened region or "boss" on the side of the angle of the lower jaw; this was probably used in intraspecific behaviour. In Doliosauriscus and Anteosaurus, not only was this boss very prominent, but the bones were very thick and rugose. The same situation is found in the herbivorous Tapinocephalidae, and it has been proposed that these animals engaged in head-butting behaviour. (Hopson & Barghusen 1986)

Classification
The subfamily Anteosaurinae has also been used in the past to include these therapsids. The Russian genera were previously included by Efremov in the family Brithopodidae. Anteosauridae is part of a larger group of dinocephalians called Anteosauria. Several recent phylogenetic studies of anteosaurians find support for two subfamilies within Anteosauridae: Anteosaurinae and Syodontinae. Below is a cladogram showing syodontine relationships from a 2012 phylogenetic study of anteosaurians:

References

Further reading
 
 
 ----- 1969, "The Fauna of the Tapincephalus Zone (Beaufort Beds of the Karoo)," Ann. S. Afr. Mus. 56 (1) 1-73, pp. 35–38
 Carroll, R. L., 1988, Vertebrate Paleontology and Evolution, WH Freeman & Co.
 Hopson, J.A. and Barghusen, H.R., 1986, An analysis of therapsid relationships in N Hotton, III, PD MacLean, JJ Roth and EC Roth, The Ecology and Biology of Mammal-like Reptiles, Smithsonian Institution Press, pp. 83–106
 King, G.M., 1988, "Anomodontia" Part 17 C, Encyclopedia of Paleoherpetology, Gutsav Fischer Verlag, Stuttgart and New York,

External links
 Palaeos

Anteosaurs
Guadalupian first appearances
Guadalupian extinctions
Prehistoric therapsid families